Vladimir Pozner may refer to
Vladimir Pozner Jr.  (born 1934), French-born Russian-American journalist and broadcaster
Vladimir Pozner Sr. (1908–1975), Soviet spy
Vladimir Pozner (writer) (1905–1992), French writer and translator, cousin of Vladimir Pozner Sr.